Song clan of Hwasun is one of the Korean clans. Their Bon-gwan is in Hwasun County, South Jeolla Province. According to the research held in 2000, the number of the Song clan of Hwasun was 4643. Their founder was  who was an orphan in Japan. When he became 18 years old, he came Busan by ship. He became a founder of Song clan of Hwasun using the name of Matsuyoshi because he did not know the name of his parents. He used the name of Song clan, because he was called Matsuyoshi.

See also 
 Korean clan names of foreign origin

References

External links 
 

Korean clan names of Japanese origin